Heinz Siegfried Wolff,  (29 April 1928 – 15 December 2017) was a German-born British scientist as well as a television and radio presenter. He was best known for the BBC television series The Great Egg Race.

Early life 
Wolff was born in Berlin. His father, Oswald Wolff, was a volunteer in World War I and a publisher specializing in German history. His mother, Margot Wolff (née Saalfeld) died "of an acute heart infection" in 1938. Father and son fled to the Netherlands in August 1939, and then arrived as Jewish refugees in Britain on 3 September 1939, on the same day that World War II was declared by Britain and France; Wolff was 11. He was educated at the City of Oxford High School for Boys.

Career
Wolff worked in haematology at the Radcliffe Infirmary in Oxford under Robert Gwyn Macfarlane, where he invented a machine for counting patients' blood cells, before joining the Pneumoconiosis Research Unit at Llandough Hospital near Cardiff. He went on to University College London (UCL), where he gained a first class honours degree in physiology and physics. Before going to UCL, he had been considered by Trinity College, Cambridge, but was rejected twice because his understanding of Latin was too weak.

He spent much of his early career in bioengineering, a term he coined in 1954 to take account of recent advances in physiology. He became an honorary member of the European Space Agency in 1975, and in 1983 he founded the Brunel Institute for Bioengineering, which was involved in biological research during weightless spaceflight. Following retirement, he was emeritus professor of bioengineering at Brunel University, working on a project aimed at addressing the care needs of older people. Wolff was the scientific director and co-founder of Project Juno, the private British-Soviet joint venture which sent Helen Sharman to the Mir space station.

He is credited with the invention of the gel pad electrodes used in ECGs.

Popular science
A familiar face in the 1970s and early 1980s, well known to British television audiences with his memorable bow tie and pronounced German accent, his best remembered programme is probably The Great Egg Race. He was also the presenter of Great Experiments, and presenter/judge of the annual Young Scientists of the Year series.  In 1985 he was a contestant on The Adventure Game.

In 1998 Professor Wolff was one of the first people to be interviewed by Ali G, during that character's initial appearances on The 11 O'Clock Show, where the discussion ranged from elementary particles to penis enlargement. Also in 1989 he appeared on After Dark with, among others, astronaut Buzz Aldrin.

In 2007 Wolff made a guest appearance on Channel 4's Comedy Lab episode "Karl Pilkington: Satisfied Fool", where he is seen explaining to Pilkington the sudden rise of intelligence in Homo sapiens.

In March 2009, he appeared in the puzzle video game Professor Heinz Wolff's Gravity.

For many years Professor Wolff was the President of Hampstead Scientific Society.

Lectures
In 1975 he delivered the Royal Institution Christmas Lectures on Signals from the Interior. In 2005 he presented the Higginson Lecture at Durham University.

Personal life
In 1953, he married Joan Stephenson, a staff nurse originally from Cardiff, whom he met at work. They lived in north London. Widowed in October 2014, he died from heart failure on 15 December 2017. He is survived by his two sons, Anthony and Laurence.

References

External links

Official 'Heinz Wolff Gravity' game site

1928 births
2017 deaths
Academics of Brunel University London
Alumni of University College London
British bioengineers
British physiologists
British television personalities
Fellows of the Institution of Electrical Engineers
Fellows of the Royal College of Physicians
Naturalised citizens of the United Kingdom
Scientists from Berlin
People educated at the City of Oxford High School for Boys
Jewish scientists
Jews who immigrated to the United Kingdom to escape Nazism
English people of German-Jewish descent